Where I'm At may refer to:

"Where I'm At", song from Live at Royal Albert Hall (Eels album)
"Where I'm At", song from H.F.M. 2 (The Hunger for More 2)
"Where I'm At", song by Master Shortie